Basmat Tab'un (Basmat Tivon) is a Bedouin town in the Northern District of Israel.

History
Basmat Tab'un was founded in 1965 by Israeli authorities as a settlement for al-Sa'adia and al-Zabidat, two Bedouin tribes who settled the area during the British Mandate. It was declared a local council. In May 2011, the Israeli government approved a four-year plan with a budget of NIS 350 million for developing Bedouin communities in the North, among them Basmat Tab'un.

The Ein Bustan (Maayan Babustan) Waldorf school in Hilf, Basmat Tab'un, is noteworthy for its multi-lingual, multi-cultural, multi-religious curriculum. The Arab students are from the surrounding villages and the Jewish students are from nearby Kiryat Tiv'on.

Notable people

 Ruan Zubidate, Israel's top female Arab tennis player. She represents Israel at tennis matches around the world.

See also
 Arab localities in Israel
 Bedouin In Israel

References

Bibliography

 (pp. 273,309)
  (p. 681)
    (p. 117)

External links

Municipal web site
Welcome To Tab'un at Palestine Remembered
Survey of Western Palestine Map 5:     IAA, Wikimedia commons

Arab localities in Israel
1965 establishments in Israel
Local councils in Northern District (Israel)